Ramal de Rio Maior was a Portuguese branch line which connected the station of Vale de Santarém, on the Linha do Norte, to the Espadanal mines, in Rio Maior.

See also 
 List of railway lines in Portugal
 History of rail transport in Portugal

References

Sources
 

Railway lines in Portugal
Iberian gauge railways